Martha Anne Grover is an American chemical engineer who is a Professor and Chair of Graduate Studies at the Georgia Tech School of Chemical and Biomolecular Engineering. Her research considers molecular self assembly and the emergence of biological functions.

Early life and education 
Grover earned her undergraduate degree at the University of Illinois at Urbana–Champaign. During her undergraduate degree, she spent a year at the Armstrong Flight Research Center. She moved to the California Institute of Technology for her graduate studies, where she completed a master's degree and doctorate. Her doctoral research considered the  simulation of thin film growth through the Monte Carlo method. Her simulations was able to recreate the nucleation and growth of atomic clusters, as well as explain the propagation of atomic layers.

Research and career 
In 2002 Grover joined Georgia Tech as an Assistant Professor. Her research considers the origins of life and structure-property relationships in carbon-based systems. She is interested in the kinetics of molecular self-assembly and how these are impacted by external stimuli. This work has wide-reaching applications, from the design of intelligent materials to the control of morphology in polymer-based photovoltaics. Grover has worked with Jennifer Glass on astrobiology.

Grover was the first woman to win the American Institute of Chemical Engineers (AIChE) David Himmelblau Award for Innovations in Computer-Based Chemical Engineering Education in 2018.

In 2020, Grover was named an National Science Foundation Organizational Change for Gender Equity in STEM Academic Professions (ADVANCE) Professor. In this capacity she serves to advocate for gender and racial equality.

Awards and honors 
 2004 National Science Foundation CAREER Award 
 2011 AIChE Outstanding Young Researcher 
 2019 AIChE Himmelblau Award for Innovations in Computer-Based Chemical Engineering Education

Selected publications

References 

Living people
Year of birth missing (living people)
Georgia Tech faculty
American chemical engineers
American women scientists
California Institute of Technology alumni
University of Illinois Urbana-Champaign alumni
American women academics
21st-century American women